The Congaturi halfbeak (Hyporhamphus limbatus), also known as the Valenciennes halfbeak, is a potamodromous species of fish in the family Hemiramphidae. It is a valued commercial fish in tropical countries both dried salted and fresh forms.

Description
The body shows typical halfbeak shape with an elongated lower jaw and cylindrical elongated body. They have no spines on fins, but do have 13-16 rays of their dorsal fins and 13-16 rays on their anal fins. The longest recorded Jumping halfbeak was 35 cm long, but most of them are 13 cm long commonly. Caudal fin emarginate.
Body is greenish above, and a silvery lateral stripe widening posteriorly. Ventrally white in color. Fleshy tip of the beak is reddish colored.

Distribution and habitat
The jumping halfbeak is found tropical waters Indo-Pacific oceans extends from Western India, around Sri Lanka, China, the Philippines. The fish also found in freshwater bodies of Cambodia and Mekong river of China. It is a surface dwelling fish that can be mostly found estuaries and lagoons.

See also
List of common commercial fish of Sri Lanka

References

External links
WoRMS
A Review of the Halfbeaks or Hemiramphidae
India Biodiversity

congaturi halfbeak
Fish of the Indian Ocean
Fish of the Pacific Ocean
congaturi halfbeak